"The Last Great American Dynasty" (stylized in all lowercase) is a song recorded by American singer-songwriter Taylor Swift, from her eighth studio album, Folklore (2020). Swift was inspired to write the song by the life of American socialite Rebekah Harkness, a former owner of her Rhode Island mansion. In the lyrics, Swift recalls Harkness's inherited wealth from her husband and decadent lifestyle, which became the gossip of the town. In the final refrain, she draws parallels between Harkness' life and hers, implying how others scrutinized them both for their personal lifestyles.

Aaron Dessner co-wrote and produced the song, a folktronica and guitar pop tune with an indie-oriented production. It is propelled by an uptempo arrangement of percussions, slide guitar, strings, and glitchy electronic elements. In reviews of Folklore, critics praised the track's narrative lyrics and production, and highlighted how it showcased Swift's songwriting from a third-person perspective. "The Last Great American Dynasty" entered the top-ten in Australia, Malaysia, and Singapore, and top-twenty in Canada, New Zealand, and the United States. Some publications placed the song in their music best-of lists of 2020. Swift included "The Last Great American Dynasty" on the set list of the Eras Tour (2023).

Background and composition 

Aiming for an uptempo and enticing sound, American musician Aaron Dessner composed the instrumentals of "The Last Great American Dynasty", inspired by the electric guitars in Radiohead's album, In Rainbows (2007). He sent the music sample to American singer-songwriter Taylor Swift, who was isolating herself due to the COVID-19 pandemic; she liked the sound, and wrote the lyrics to the song in under the time Dessner would go out for a run and return. The lyrics were inspired by the life of American socialite Rebekah Harkness, whom Swift wanted to write about ever since she purchased Holiday House in 2013.

In a 2020 Entertainment Weekly interview, Swift revealed that she first learned about Harkness from a real estate agent who walked her through the property. Consequently, the singer started reading a lot about Harkness's life and found her stories interesting. It led to the development of parallels between Harkness and herself, both of them "being the lady that lives in that house on the hill that everybody gets to gossip about". Swift stated she was looking for a chance to write about Harkness, and finally found it when she heard the instrumental track that Dessner sent. Swift employed a narrative device in the song's lyrics commonly found in country music, which she described as: "the first verse you sing about someone else, the second verse you sing about someone else who's even closer to you, and then in the third verse, you go, 'Surprise! It was me'. You bring it personal for the last verse".

"The Last Great American Dynasty" is a folktronica and guitar pop tune that embraces an alternative, indie-leaning production, making use of classical instruments like slide guitar, viola, violins and drums. Swift's vocal range in the song spans between E3 to B4. The song is written in the key of G major and has a moderately fast tempo of 148 beats per minute. In a 2021 exclusive for People, Swift further explained why Harkness inspired the song: "It can be a real pearl-clutching moment for society when a woman owns her desires and wildness, and I love the idea that the woman in question would be too joyful in her freedom to even care that she's ruffling feathers, raising eyebrows or becoming the talk of the town. The idea that she decided there were marvelous times to be had, and that was more important".

Lyrics 

"The Last Great American Dynasty" narrates the story and satirizes the vilification of American socialite and composer Rebekah Harkness, who previously inhabited the Holiday House—Swift's mansion in Watch Hill, an affluent coastal village in Westerly, Rhode Island. Written in a townsfolk third-person narrative, it details the following: Rebekah West, a middle-class divorcée from St. Louis, married William "Bill" Harkness in 1947, who was the heir to Standard Oil, an oil-refining company that was the 19th-century's first and largest multinational corporation in the world. The couple bought a seaside estate in Watch Hill, Rhode Island, and nicknamed it "Holiday House". Bill died of heart attack in 1954, for which Rebekah was blamed by the town. After her then-husband's death, Rebekah inherited his enormous wealth and became one of the wealthiest women in the US.

Rebekah invited "big names" and her "bitch pack"—a group of female city friends—to the house, and spent the new money by throwing numerous high-class events and "outrageous" parties; Watch Hill scorned her for causing the downfall of the Harkness family, calling her the maddest and the "most shameless" woman in the town's history. Pursuing her passion for arts, Rebekah founded a professional ballet company in 1964, called the Harkness Ballet. Further details in the song about Harkness' life include: how she gambled with Spanish surrealist artist Salvador Dalí, "filled" her swimming pool with champagne, when in fact, she had only used champagne to clean the pool, and stole a neighbor's dog and dyed it lime green because of a feud, whereas in reality, it was a cat instead of a dog, which implies the inaccuracy of gossips—one of many lyrical motifs present in Folklore. The lyric "she had a marvelous time ruining everything" refers to the hate she received from the town and tabloids, and how Rebekah is infamous for "not fitting in".

In the song's bridge, Swift reveals her purchase of the Holiday House after 50 years of its vacancy, and in the final chorus, she shifts to first-person narrative, proclaiming herself "the loudest woman" the town has ever seen, and correlates between her celebrity life and Rebekah's controversies. Swift resonates her highly criticized moves with elements of Rebekah's story, and concludes the song with an outro of "I had a marvelous time ruining everything". Mainstream media has linked several moments of Swift's unfavorable press to that of Rebekah's, including the scrutiny the singer faces because of her highly publicized romantic life, her "squad" of popular celebrities, the Fourth of July parties she threw at the Holiday House, Watch Hill residents' concerns about the attention Swift brings to the community, and the governor of Rhode Island, Gina Raimondo, suggesting a tax on secondary homes costlier than $1 million, which was famously dubbed "the Taylor Swift tax". "The Last Great American Dynasty" is thematically feminist, and thus considered to be a prequel to the twelfth Folklore track, "Mad Woman".

Critical reception 
Critics praised "The Last Great American Dynasty" for Swift's signature wordplay and the storytelling plot. Hannah Mylrea of NME lauded the song for its brooding instrumentals, Swift's peculiar vocals, and storytelling style reminiscent of works by Mary Chapin Carpenter and Bob Dylan, and pitted it as "a contender for the best Taylor Swift song ever written". Noting its historical details, Americana imagery and "Fitzgerald-esque" lines, Pitchfork writer Julian Mapes hailed the song as "the all-timer, the instant classic" that celebrates society-defying women, and stated that the lyrics "play out in your mind like a storybook", but successfully point out society's reception of assertive women. Mapes also hailed the production as "textural and tastefully majestic". Finding the song's lyricism as the most impressive storytelling from all of Folklore, Mikael Wood of the Los Angeles Times named the song the most humorous of all tracks, ranking it the album's third best song. Wood described it "a detailed portrait of the real-life woman who owned Swift's Rhode Island mansion—and evidently scandalized the town's gentry—decades before the singer did".

PopMatters critic Michael Sumsion labelled the song a shrewd comparison that upgrades a small-town tale into a "towering myth". Callie Ahlgrim of Insider asserted the twist in the song's bridge as "poetic genius". She further compared the final chorus tuning back to the present, underlining the parallels between Rebekah and Swift, to the bridge of Swift's 2008 hit, "Love Story", where Romeo proposes. Chris Willman of Variety opined that Swift has "a grand old time" identifying herself with women who lived decades before her. In congruence, Rob Sheffield of Rolling Stone wrote that the song satirizes the upper-class environment of "Starlight", the fifteenth track on Swift's 2012 album Red, and matched the similarities between the songs—the usage of the word "marvelous" and the muses being people who lived decades before Swift's birth.

Uproxx writer Philip Cosores regarded "The Last Great American Dynasty" as entrenched in Swift's trademark "melodic warmth" and "vivid details", and complimented Dessner's slow-burning production. Olivia Ovenden of Esquire picked the song as the album's highlight, and commended it for "seamlessly" blending indie sounds with Swift's pop prowess. Jon Caramanica of The New York Times commented that the subject of the song, Harkness, is "a classic Swift heroine", who is purposeful, disruptive and misunderstood. Jonathan Keefe, writing for Slant, thought the song highlights how Swift's "widening worldview" has enhanced her songwriting skills. Caleb Campbell, writing for Under The Radar, found Swift seeing herself in the misogynistic tabloid gossip that afflicted Harkness, but shunning out the "diaristic, reputation-obsessed" semblance of her older catalogue.

Katie Moulton, writing for Consequence of Sound, summarized that the song is a result of Swift's imagination expanding, as she is "consciously trying to write from perspectives not her own". Nick Levine of The Telegraph pondered whether Swift is only acknowledging tensions with Watch Hill locals in the song, or if she is designating herself the successor to Harkness, and picked "The Last Great American Dynasty" as an album standout for exemplifying why Swift is one of the great songwriters of her generation. Billboard listed "The Last Great American Dynasty" as one of its 20 picks for 2020 Song of the Summer, and remarked that the song gives-off "a more summery vibe" despite the generally "chillier" atmosphere of Folklore.

Accolades 
In her list ranking all 161 songs by Swift yet, Hannah Mylrea of NME placed the song at number two, only behind "All Too Well" (2012). She was impressed at how "The Last Great American Dynasty" manages to communicate a huge portion of Harkness's life in under few minutes, topping it off with a "banging" chorus. NME placed the song at number eight on its list of 50 best songs of 2020, stating "Swift engaged masterful storytelling techniques over Dessner's glitchy, cantering production, vividly spinning the tale of Harkness' life while drawing parallels between the sexist criticism both women have received [...] It's an astonishing song: one that fuses witty lyricism with megawatt hooks, and a reminder that Taylor Swift is an artist who should never be underestimated." Uproxx listed the track as the 15th best song of 2020, with Caitlin White dubbing it a "quintessential Swiftian creation". Pitchfork named it the 32nd best song of 2020 on its list ranking the year's 100 best songs. Billboard ranked it as the 39th best song of 2020, while American Songwriter listed it amongst its 20 best songs of the year. In 2021, Rob Sheffield placed "The Last Great American Dynasty" at number 17 on his ranking of Swift's 199 songs, while Clash critics named it one of the 15 best songs in her discography.

Commercial performance 
Upon release of Folklore, "The Last Great American Dynasty" reached the top-20 in many countries worldwide. In the US, all of the album's 16 tracks debuted on the Billboard Hot 100 simultaneously, with the song at number 13—the fourth highest-peaking song from the album, behind "Cardigan" (number one), "The 1" (number four) and "Exile" (number six), and one of its five top-20 entries. It further debuted at number 42 on the Billboard Digital Song Sales chart. The song peaked at number 13 on both of the Canadian Hot 100 and New Zealand Top 40 Singles charts.

In Australia, "The Last Great American Dynasty" debuted at number seven on the ARIA Singles Chart; along with four other tracks from Folklore that landed in the top-10, giving the album five top-10 entries in the country. The album spawned five top-10 debuts in Malaysia as well, where the song peaked at number 10 on the RIM Singles chart. On the Singapore Top 30 Digital Streaming chart, it peaked at number nine, marking the fourth top-10 entry from Folklore in the country. The song further arrived at numbers 56, 81 and 89 on Ö3 Austria Top 40, Portugal's AFP Top 200 Singles and Sweden's Sverigetopplistan, respectively.

Credits and personnel
Credits are adapted from the liner notes of Folklore.

 Taylor Swift – vocals, songwriting
 Aaron Dessner – production, songwriting, recording, drum programming, keyboards, percussion, piano, synthesizer, bass guitar, electric guitar, slide guitar
 Bryce Dessner – orchestration
 Rob Moose – orchestration, violin, viola
 J.T. Bates – drums
 Jonathan Low – mixing, recording
 Laura Sisk – vocal engineering
 Randy Merrill – mastering

Charts

Certifications

See also
 List of top 10 singles in 2020 (Australia)
 Samuel Goldwyn Estate

References

2020 songs
Taylor Swift songs
Songs written by Taylor Swift
Songs written by Aaron Dessner
Song recordings produced by Aaron Dessner
Folktronica songs
Satirical songs
Songs about Rhode Island
Songs based on American history
Songs with feminist themes
Harkness family
Songs about socialites